Paul Bigot (20 October 1870 – 8 June 1942) was a French architect.

Biography
Bigot was born in Orbec, Calvados. He studied architecture at the École nationale supérieure des Beaux-Arts in Paris, in the atelier of Louis-Jules André. He won the Grand Prix de Rome in 1900, which enabled him to study in Rome at the Villa Medici. He later became a professor at the École des Beaux-Arts.

He is particularly known for his "", a large architectural model of Ancient Rome. It is a plaster model of about 70 square metres at a scale of 1:400, showing Rome as it would have been in the time of the emperor Constantine I (4th century AD).  The model is preserved at the University of Caen and is itself listed as an ancient monument. A second version is in the Royal Museums of Art and History in Brussels.

Bigot was the architect of the Institut d'Art et d'Archéologie, in Paris, completed in 1932.

Works

 1908-1942: , a large model of Rome in 350 CE. 
 1920-1932: Institut d'Art et d'Archéologie, Paris
 1922: reconstruction of the town of Fargniers following its comprehensive destruction during World War I, in association with Henri Paul Nénot, financed by the Carnegie Endowment for International Peace
 1924-1934: reconstruction of the neighborhood around the Saint-Quentin station in Saint-Quentin, including the Monument aux Morts with sculptors Henri Bouchard and Paul Landowski
 1930: Monument of the First Battle of the Marne in Mondement
 1933: Monument to Aristide Briand on the Quai d'Orsay, Paris, with Henri Bouchard and Paul Landowski
 1935: refurbishment of Hôtel Matignon as office and residence of the French Prime Minister
 1935-1939: expansion of the Ministry of Foreign Affairs
 1936: Monument to Ferdinand Foch, Paris, with sculptor

See also
 Armando Brasini
 Paul Tournon

References

Notes

External links
 Le Plan de Rome website at University of Caen
 Biography: "Paul Bigot: a Norman in Rome"
 Modern Mechanix: Model of Rome Took Thirty Years to Build (Jun, 1934)
  See: Designed / created by Arch. Paul Bigot ("Prix de Rome"), c. 1906–1911. News Report: REMARKABLE RESTORATION OF THE ANCIENT CITY MADE IN MODEL, THE NEW YORK TIMES (26-11-1911, pg. SM8). cf.
  Martin. G. Conde, Rome. Model's of Ancient Rome [Area of the Imperial Fora]: Giuseppe Marcelliani (1905–1906); Paul Bigot (1906–1911, 1942); Italo Gismondi / Pierino Di Carlo (1933–1937, & later revisions).
 Works by Paul Bigot

1870 births
1942 deaths
People from Calvados (department)
Prix de Rome for architecture
20th-century French architects
École des Beaux-Arts alumni
Academic staff of the École des Beaux-Arts
Members of the Académie des beaux-arts